An ethnoreligious group (or an ethno-religious group) is a grouping of people who are unified by a common religious and ethnic background.

Furthermore, the term ethno-religious group, along with ethno-regional and ethno-linguistic groups, is a sub-category of ethnicity and is used as evidence of belief in a common culture and ancestry.

In a narrower sense, they refer to groups whose religious and ethnic traditions are historically linked.

Characteristics 
The elements that are defined as characteristics of an ethnoreligious group are "social character, historical experience, and theological beliefs".

A closing of the community takes place through a strict endogamy, which is specifically for the community and that distinguishes an ethno-religious community, that is, as distinct from any other group.

Defining an ethnoreligious group 
In general, ethnoreligious communities define their ethnic identity not only by ancestral heritage nor simply by religious affiliation but normally through a combination of both. An ethnoreligious group has a shared history and a cultural tradition – which can be defined as religious – of its own. In many cases ethnoreligious groups are ethno-cultural groups with a traditional ethnic religion; in other cases ethnoreligious groups begin as communities united by a common faith which through endogamy developed cultural and ancestral ties.

Some ethnoreligious groups' identities are reinforced by the experience of living within a larger community as a distinct minority. Ethnoreligious groups can be tied to ethnic nationalism if the ethnoreligious group possesses a historical base in a specific region. In many ethnoreligious groups emphasis is placed upon religious endogamy, and the concurrent discouragement of interfaith marriages or intercourse, as a means of preserving the stability and historical longevity of the community and culture.

Examples

Jews 

Prior to the Babylonian exile, the Israelites had already emerged as an ethnoreligious group, probably before the time of Hosea.

Since the 19th century, Reform Judaism has differed from Orthodox Judaism on matters of theology and practice; however, toward the end of the 20th century and into the 21st century, the Reform movement has reoriented itself back toward certain traditions and practices it had previously relinquished (for example, wearing the tallit and/or the kippah; the use of Hebrew in the liturgy). In the United States, the increasing rate of mixed marriages has led to attempts to facilitate conversion of the spouse, although conversion to facilitate marriage is strongly discouraged by traditional Jewish law. If the spouse does not convert, the Reform movement will recognize patrilineal descent. Traditional interpretations of Jewish law only recognize descent along the maternal line. Many children of mixed marriages do not identify as Jews and the Reform movement only recognizes children of mixed marriages as Jewish if they "established through appropriate and timely public and formal acts of identification with the Jewish faith and people." In actual practice, most Reform Jews affirm patrilineal descent as a valid means of Jewish identification, particularly if the individual was "raised Jewish".

Since the mid 1960s, Israeli national identity has become linked with Jewish identity as a result of Zionism. In Israel, Jewish religious courts have authority over personal status matters, which has led to friction with secular Jews who sometimes find they must leave the country in order to marry or divorce, particularly in relation to the inherited status of mamzer, the marriage of males from the priestly line, persons not recognized as Jewish by the rabbinate, and in cases of agunot. The Israeli rabbinate only recognizes certain approved Orthodox rabbis as legitimate, which has led to friction with Diaspora Jews who for centuries never had an overarching authority.

Anabaptists 

Other classical examples for ethnoreligious groups are traditional Anabaptist groups like the Old Order Amish, the Hutterites, the Old Order Mennonites and traditional groups of Plautdietsch-speaking Russian Mennonites, like the Old Colony Mennonites. All these groups have a shared cultural background, a shared dialect as their everyday language (Pennsylvania German, Hutterisch, Plautdietsch), a shared version of their Anabaptist faith, a shared history of several hundred years and they have accepted very few outsiders into their communities in the last 250 years. They may also share common foods, dress, and other customs. Modern proselytizing Mennonite groups, such as the Evangelical Mennonite Conference whose members have lost their shared ancestry, their common ethnic language Plautdietsch, their traditional dress and other typical ethnic traditions, are no longer seen as an ethnoreligious group, although members within these groups may still identify with the term Mennonite as an ethnic identifier.

As legal concept

Australia
In Australian law, the Anti-Discrimination Act 1977 of New South Wales defines "race" to include "ethnic, ethno-religious or national origin". The reference to "ethno-religious" was added by the Anti-Discrimination (Amendment) Act 1994 (NSW). John Hannaford, the NSW Attorney-General at the time, explained, "The effect of the latter amendment is to clarify that ethno-religious groups, such as Jews, Muslims and Sikhs, have access to the racial vilification and discrimination provisions of the Act.... extensions of the Anti-Discrimination Act to ethno-religious groups will not extend to discrimination on the ground of religion".

The definition of "race" in Anti-Discrimination Act 1998 (Tas) likewise includes "ethnic, ethno-religious or national origin".  However, unlike the NSW Act, it also prohibits discrimination on the grounds of "religious belief or affiliation" or "religious activity".

United Kingdom

In the United Kingdom the landmark legal case Mandla v Dowell-Lee placed a legal definition on ethnic groups with religious ties, which, in turn, has paved the way for the definition of an ethnoreligious group.  Both Jews and Sikhs were determined to be considered ethnoreligious groups under the Anti-Discrimination (Amendment) Act 1994 (see above).

The Anti-Discrimination (Amendment) Act 1994 made reference to Mandla v Dowell-Lee, which defined ethnic groups as:

 a long shared history, of which the group is conscious as distinguishing it from other groups, and the memory of which it keeps alive;
a cultural tradition of its own, including family and social customs and manners, often but not necessarily associated with religious observance. In addition to those two essential characteristics the following characteristics are, in my opinion, relevant:
either a common geographical origin, or descent from a small number of common ancestors;
a common language, not necessarily peculiar to the group;
a common literature peculiar to the group;
a common religion different from that of neighbouring groups or from the general community surrounding it;
being a minority or being an oppressed or dominant group within a larger community. For example, a conquered people (say, the inhabitants of England shortly after the Norman conquest) and their conquerors might both be ethnic groups.

The significance of the case was that groups like Sikhs and Jews could now be protected under the Race Relations Act 1976.

See also
 Religious assimilation
 Folk religion
 Religious segregation
 Symbolic ethnicity
Ethnolinguistic group

References

Bibliography

 
 
 
 
 
 
 

 Yang, F. and Ebaugh, H. R. (2001), Religion and Ethnicity Among New Immigrants: The Impact of Majority/Minority Status in Home and Host Countries . Journal for the Scientific Study of Religion, 40: 367–378. doi:10.1111/0021-8294.00063
 Phillip E. Hammond and Kee Warner, Religion and Ethnicity in Late-Twentieth-Century America, The Annals of the American Academy of Political and Social, Vol. 527, Religion in the Nineties (May, 1993), pp. 55–66

External links

 
Sociology of religion